Lebanon competed at the 2013 Mediterranean Games in Mersin, Turkey from the 20th to 30 June 2013.

Archery 

Men

Badminton

Boxing 

Men

Cycling

Fencing 

Croatia will be represented by one fencer.

Men

Women

Gymnastics

Artistic 

Men

Judo

Swimming 

Men

Women

References

Nations at the 2013 Mediterranean Games
2013
Mediterranean Games